Computable general equilibrium (CGE) models are a class of economic models that use actual economic data to estimate how an economy might react to changes in policy, technology or other external factors. CGE models are also referred to as AGE (applied general equilibrium) models.

Overview

A CGE model consists of equations describing model variables and a database (usually very detailed) consistent with these model equations. The equations tend to be neoclassical in spirit, often assuming cost-minimizing behaviour by producers, average-cost pricing, and household demands based on optimizing behaviour. However, most CGE models conform only loosely to the theoretical general equilibrium paradigm. For example, they may allow for:
 non-market clearing, especially for labour (unemployment) or for commodities (inventories)
 imperfect competition (e.g., monopoly pricing)
 demands not influenced by price (e.g., government demands)

A CGE model database consists of:
 tables of transaction values, showing, for example, the value of coal used by the iron industry. Usually the database is presented as an input-output table or as a social accounting matrix (SAM). In either case, it covers the whole economy of a country (or even the whole world), and distinguishes a number of sectors, commodities, primary factors and perhaps types of households. Sectoral coverage ranges from relatively simple representations of capital, labor and intermediates to highly detailed representations of specific sub-sectors (e.g., the electricity sector in GTAP-Power.)
 elasticities: dimensionless parameters that capture behavioural response. For example, export demand elasticities specify by how much export volumes might fall if export prices went up. Other elasticities may belong to the constant elasticity of substitution class. Amongst these are Armington elasticities, which show whether products of different countries are close substitutes, and elasticities measuring how easily inputs to production may be substituted for one another. Income elasticity of demand shows how household demands respond to income changes.

CGE models are descended from the input-output models pioneered by Wassily Leontief, but assign a more important role to prices. Thus, where Leontief assumed that, say, a fixed amount of labour was required to produce a ton of iron, a CGE model would normally allow wage levels to (negatively) affect labour demands.

CGE models derive too from the models for planning the economies of poorer countries constructed (usually by a foreign expert) from 1960 onwards. Compared to the Leontief model, development planning models focused more on constraints or shortages—of skilled labour, capital, or foreign exchange.

CGE modelling of richer economies descends from Leif Johansen's 1960 MSG model of Norway, and the static model developed by the Cambridge Growth Project in the UK. Both models were pragmatic in flavour, and traced variables through time. The Australian MONASH model is a modern representative of this class. Perhaps the first CGE model similar to those of today was that of Taylor and Black (1974).

CGE models are useful whenever we wish to estimate the effect of changes in one part of the economy upon the rest. For example, a tax on flour might affect bread prices, the CPI, and hence perhaps wages and employment. They have been used widely to analyse trade policy. More recently, CGE has been a popular way to estimate the economic effects of measures to reduce greenhouse gas emissions.

CGE models always contain more variables than equations—so some variables must be set outside the model. These variables are termed exogenous; the remainder, determined by the model, is called endogenous. The choice of which variables are to be exogenous is called the model closure, and may give rise to controversy. For example, some modelers hold employment and the trade balance fixed; others allow these to vary. Variables defining technology, consumer tastes, and government instruments (such as tax rates) are usually exogenous.

Today there are many CGE models of different countries. One of the most well-known CGE models is global: the GTAP model of world trade.

CGE models are useful to model the economies of countries for which time series data are scarce or not relevant (perhaps because of disturbances such as regime changes). Here, strong, reasonable, assumptions embedded in the model must replace historical evidence. Thus developing economies are often analysed using CGE models, such as those based on the IFPRI template model.

Comparative-static and dynamic CGE models

Many CGE models are comparative static: they model the reactions of the economy at only one point in time. For policy analysis, results from such a model are often interpreted as showing the reaction of the economy in some future period to one or a few external shocks or policy changes. That is, the results show the difference (usually reported in percent change form) between two alternative future states (with and without the policy shock). The process of adjustment to the new equilibrium, in particular the reallocation of labor and capital across sectors, usually is not explicitly represented in such a model.

In contrast, long-run models focus on adjustments to the underlying resource base when modeling policy changes. This can include dynamic adjustment to the labor supply, adjustments in installed and overall capital stocks, and even adjustment to overall productivity and market structure. There are two broad approaches followed in the policy literature to such long-run adjustment. One involves what is called "comparative steady state" analysis. Under such an approach, long-run or steady-state closure rules are used, under either forward-looking or recursive dynamic behavior, to solve for long-run adjustments.

The alternative approach involves explicit modeling of dynamic adjustment paths. These models can seem more realistic, but are more challenging to construct and solve. They require for instance that future changes are predicted for all exogenous variables, not just those affected by a possible policy change. The dynamic elements may arise from partial adjustment processes or from stock/flow accumulation relations: between capital stocks and investment, and between foreign debt and trade deficits. However there is a potential consistency problem because the variables that change from one equilibrium solution to the next are not necessarily consistent with each other during the period of change. The modeling of the path of adjustment may involve forward-looking expectations, where agents' expectations depend on the future state of the economy and it is necessary to solve for all periods simultaneously, leading to full multi-period dynamic CGE models. An alternative is recursive dynamics. Recursive-dynamic CGE models are those that can be solved sequentially (one period at a time). They assume that behaviour depends only on current and past states of the economy. Recursive dynamic models where a single period is solved for, comparative steady-state analysis, is a special case of recursive dynamic modeling over what can be multiple periods.

Techniques

Early CGE models were often solved by a program custom-written for that particular model. Models were expensive to construct and sometimes appeared as a 'black box' to outsiders. Now, most CGE models are formulated and solved using one of the GAMS or GEMPACK software systems.
AMPL, Excel and MATLAB are also used. Use of such systems has lowered the cost of entry to CGE modelling; allowed model simulations to be independently replicated; and increased the transparency of the models.

See also
 Macroeconomic model

References

Further reading

 Adelman, Irma and Sherman Robinson (1978). Income Distribution Policy in Developing Countries: A Case Study of Korea, Stanford University Press
 Baldwin, Richard E., and Joseph F. Francois, eds. Dynamic Issues in Commercial Policy Analysis. Cambridge University Press, 1999. 
 Bouët, Antoine (2008). The Expected Benefits of Trade Liberalization for World Income and Development: Opening the "Black Box" of Global Trade Modeling
 Burfisher, Mary, Introduction to Computable General Equilibrium Models, Cambridge University Press: Cambridge, 2011, 
 Cardenete, M. Alejandro, Guerra, Ana-Isabel and Sancho, Ferran (2012). Applied General Equilibrium: An Introduction. Springer
 Corong, Erwin L.; et al. (2017). "The Standard GTAP Model, Version 7". Journal of Global Economic Analysis. 2 (1): 1–119. 
 Dervis, Kemal; Jaime de Melo and Sherman Robinson (1982). General Equilibrium Models for Development Policy. Cambridge University Press
 Dixon, Peter; Brian Parmenter; John Sutton and Dave Vincent (1982). ORANI: A Multisectoral Model of the Australian Economy, North-Holland
 Dixon, Peter; Brian Parmenter; Alan Powell and Peter Wilcoxen (1992). Notes and Problems in Applied General Equilibrium Economics, North Holland
 Dixon, Peter (2006). Evidence-based Trade Policy Decision Making in Australia and the Development of Computable General Equilibrium Modelling, CoPS/IMPACT Working Paper Number G-163
 Dixon, Peter and Dale W. Jorgenson, ed. (2013). Handbook of Computable General Equilibrium Modeling, vols. 1A and 1B, North Holland, 
 Ginsburgh, Victor and Michiel Keyzer (1997). The Structure of Applied General Equilibrium Models, MIT Press
 Hertel, Thomas, Global Trade Analysis: Modeling and Applications (Modelling and Applications), Cambridge University Press: Cambridge, 1999, 
 Kehoe, Patrick J. and Timothy J. Kehoe (1994) "A Primer on Static Applied General Equilibrium Models", Federal Reserve Bank of Minneapolis Quarterly Review, 18(2)
 Kehoe, Timothy J. and Edward C. Prescott (1995) Edited volume on "Applied General Equilibrium", Economic Theory, 6
 Lanz, Bruno and Rutherford, Thomsa F. (2016) "GTAPinGAMS: Multiregional and Small Open Economy Models". Journal of Global Economic Analysis, vol. 1(2):1–77. 
 
 Reinert, Kenneth A., and Joseph F. Francois, eds. Applied Methods for Trade Policy Analysis: A Handbook. Cambridge University Press, 1997. 
 Shoven, John and John Whalley (1984). "Applied General-Equilibrium Models of Taxation and International Trade: An Introduction and Survey". Journal of Economic Literature, vol. 22(3) 1007–51
 Shoven, John and John Whalley (1992). Applying General Equilibrium, Cambridge University Press

External links
gEcon – software for DSGE and CGE modeling

General equilibrium theory
Mathematical and quantitative methods (economics)